Crown College is the name of several schools in the United States:
Crown College, University of California, Santa Cruz, a residential college
Crown College (Minnesota), a private college in St. Bonifacius, Minnesota
Crown College (Tennessee), a Baptist Bible college and seminary in Powell, Tennessee
Crown College (Washington), a defunct for-profit college